Zhemgang District (Dzongkha: གཞམས་སྒང་རྫོང་ཁག་; Wylie transliteration: Gzhams-sgang rdzong-khag; previously "Shemgang"), is one of the 20 dzongkhags (districts) comprising Bhutan. It is bordered by Sarpang, Trongsa, Bumthang, Mongar and Pemagatshel Districts, and borders Assam in India to the south. The administrative center of the district is Zhemgang.

Languages
The dominant language in Zhemgang is Khengkha. Historically, Khengkha and its speakers have had close contact with speakers of Kurtöpkha, Nupbikha, and Bumthangkha to the north, to the extent that they may be considered part of a wider collection of "Bumthang languages."  The term Ngalop may subsume several related linguistic and cultural groups, such as the Kheng people and speakers of Bumthang language.
S.R. Chakravarty asserts that Kheng are one of the earliest inhabitants that language spread upwards from Kheng into Bumthang and Kurtöp. By all accounts the Kheng are more closely related to the people of central Bhutan than they are to their neighbors in eastern Bhutan, who are primarily Sharchops. The Kheng still retain special trade relations with the Bumthang, including providing winter pasture rights for Bumthang yaks. SIL International estimates there are 50,000 Kheng speakers.

Security issues
Starting in the 1990s, the United Liberation Front of Assam maintained guerrilla bases in the forests of southern Zhemgang from which they would launch attacks on targets in India and then return across the border. In late 2003 the King of Bhutan, Jigme Singye Wangchuck led a military operation which largely swept the guerrillas out of the region. Because of the risk of attack, foreign tourists were not allowed to visit Zhemgang in the past.

Administrative divisions
Zhemgang Districts comprises eight village blocks (or gewogs):

Bardho Gewog
Bjoka Gewog
Goshing Gewog
Nangkor Gewog
Ngangla Gewog
Phangkhar Gewog
Shingkhar Gewog
Trong Gewog

Environment
Most of Zhemgang District is part of the protected areas of Bhutan. Zhemgang's environmentally protected areas include Jigme Singye Wangchuck National Park (the gewog of Trong) and Royal Manas National Park (the gewogs of Ngangla, Pangkhar and Trong), which occupy much of the west. These parks connect to Phrumsengla National Park in the north (the gewogs of Nangkor and Shingkhar) via a biological corridor that bisects Zhemgang.

See also
Districts of Bhutan
Trongsa Province

References

Further reading

External links
 Zhemgang Dzongkhag official website

 
Districts of Bhutan